The 2017 President of the Chamber of Deputies of Brazil election took place on 2 February 2017, following the opening of the 3rd session of the 55th Legislature of the National Congress. Incumbent President Rodrigo Maia (DEM-RJ) received 293 votes, way over the majority of the chamber, to become its President. PTB leader Jovair Arantes (PTB-GO) garnered 105 votes, with 106 more going to other candidates (59 to André Figueiredo, 28 to Júlio Delgado, 10 to Luiza Erundina, 4 to Jair Bolsonaro, and 5 blank votes). As only 504 deputies in the 513-member Chamber cast a vote (due to absentees or members present but not voting), 253 votes were necessary in order to win.

Formal voting

References

2017 elections in Brazil
February 2017 events in South America
President of the Chamber of Deputies of Brazil elections